The Secret Island of Dr. Quandary is an educational computer puzzle game developed by MECC, which pits the player against a variety of mathematical and logical puzzles. It was released in 1992 for MS-DOS and Macintosh.

Story
The player starts as a human playing in a shooting gallery in Dr. Quandary's carnival, and is given a live-action figure when the shooting game is defeated. However, it is a ruse for Dr. Quandary to put the player in the doll and transport them to his secret island, where the player must gather and brew the Fixer Elixir in order to escape.

Puzzles
There are a variety of puzzles in the game, most requiring some mathematical or logic skills, with some memory challenges thrown in as well. There are also varieties of traditional puzzles, such as the Tower of Hanoi and Nim. Beating each puzzle nets the player an ingredient for the Fixer Elixir, the recipe of which can be a puzzle in itself for the harder difficulty levels.

References

External links

Mathematical education video games
1992 video games
DOS games
Classic Mac OS games
Sentient toys in fiction
Video games about toys
Video games developed in the United States
Video games set on fictional islands
The Learning Company games